Lara Scandar (orn December 18, 1990) is an Egyptian-American singer and songwriter who rose to fame in 2009 after winning the finals in the Pan Arab talent show, Star Academy.

Life and career

Early life
Scandar was born on December 18, 1990, in Santa Monica, California to an Egyptian-Italian father and a Lebanese mother, and she is a Christian. Her family moved back to Cairo, Egypt right after her birth. Scandar grew up in a music-loving family where both her father and grandfather enjoyed singing as a hobby. She and her sister Tamara were always encouraged to perform in school plays and musicals as well as out of school activities.

Scandar’s parents enrolled her in ballet classes at the age of 4, which she continued to study until the age of 15. At age 6, she began modeling in catwalks for kids’ clothing brands as well as TV and print ads. She continued to model until the age of 17, right before her admission to Star Academy.

Star Academy
After graduating from high school, Scandar auditioned for Star Academy, a Pan-Arab talent show based in Lebanon that brings together young talents from all over the Arab world that have to live together and compete for the "Star" title. She was one of three Egyptians chosen to represent her country on the sixth season of the show, which debuted in February 2009. Scandar stood out by singing in several languages (English, French, Spanish and Italian). She was the last Egyptian remaining in the competition and reached the semi-finals.

Post-Star Academy
After Scandar's popularity in Star Academy 6, award-winning Lebanese producer and composer Jean-Marie Riachi approached her, and they have worked together since then. She released her first single "Mission Is You" on February 3, 2010, for which she won the MEMA (Middle East Music Award) for the Encouragement Award given to rising artists with evident potential to succeed. Her second and third singles followed within the next year.

Herbal Essences
In 2011, it was announced that Scandar had been chosen to be the face of Herbal Essences Arabia. She wrote her third single, "See The Beauty", specifically for the brand’s advertising campaign.

About A Girl
In 2012, Scandar released her first studio album About A Girl, which included three songs written by her, one Arabic track, a dance cover of Toto Cutugno’s "L’Italiano" and six other tracks. The success of her single "Taalou Ghannou Maaya" (Toto Cutugno’s cover) garnered a larger Arabic-speaking audience and helped gain more recognition in the Arab world as well as several other music awards and nominations.

2014–present

Scandar teamed up with Herbal Essences Arabia for the first online interactive concert in the Middle East, covering popular Egyptian classics as well as originals and other covers in English. The concert allowed fans to interact with the musician during the concert and be the first to listen to her new single "Love Birds".

Scandar is currently working on her new album. She released "Khalas Khalas", her first Lebanese single, in April 2017 and its video clip in May 2017.

Discography

As featured artist

Awards

References

1990 births
Living people
21st-century Egyptian women singers
Women pop singers
Singers from Cairo
American people of Italian descent
American people of Lebanese descent
American people of Egyptian descent
Egyptian people of Italian descent
Egyptian people of Lebanese descent
Star Academy participants
American emigrants to Egypt
American Christians
Egyptian Christians